The Copa del Rey  1906 was the 4th staging of the Copa del Rey, the Spanish football cup competition.

The competition started on 9 April 1906, and concluded on 11 April 1906 with the last group stage match. Madrid FC lifted the trophy for the second time with two victories, over Recreativo de Huelva and Athletic Bilbao, with the three teams that entered the tournament playing in a triangular. 

The X Sporting Club, Catalonia championship winners, did not  enter the tournament due to internal dissent and the excessive costs of travelling to Madrid.

Almost all of the Recreativo de Huelva team players were English.

Group stage

References

External links
 linguasport.com
RSSSF.com

1906
1906 domestic association football cups
1905–06 in Spanish football